The Microgenomates are a proposed supergroup of bacterial candidate phyla in the Candidate Phyla Radiation.

Organisms from the Microgenomates group have never been cultured in a lab; rather they have only been detected in the environment through genetic sequencing.

The Microgenomates group was originally discovered from sequences retrieved from the Yellowstone National Park hot spring "Obsidian Pool" and named OP11.

The group was later split into the additional bacterial phyla Absconditabacteria (SR1) and Parcubacteria (OD1) and then into over 11 more bacterial phyla, including Curtisbacteria, Daviesbacteria, Levybacteria, Gottesmanbacteria, Woesebacteria, Amesbacteria, Shapirobacteria, Roizmanbacteria, Beckwithbacteria, Collierbacteria, Pacebacteria.

References 

Bacteria phyla
Yellowstone National Park
Candidatus taxa